Belsay Hall is a Regency style country house located at Belsay, Northumberland. It is regarded as the first British country house to be built entirely in the new Greek revival style. It is a Grade I listed building. It was built to supersede Belsay Castle and its adjoining earlier hall just a few hundred yards away, and is part of the same estate.

History

The house was built between 1810 and 1817 for Sir Charles Monck (then of Belsay Castle close by) to his own design, possibly assisted by architect John Dobson.  It is built in ashlar with a Lakeland slate roof in the Greek Doric style.

The house measures  square, with a lower kitchen wing attached to the north side. Externally the house appears to have two stories, although there is an additional storey hidden within the roof space to provide servant accommodation.

This service side of the house was badly affected by dry rot in the 1970s and, following remedial work, it has been left as a weather-proof shell to illustrate how the house was built. The hall was the residence of the Middleton family until 1962.

Present day
The entire Belsay Hall house is unfurnished and maintained in a condition of benign decay, with only necessary structural maintenance undertaken. This allows it to be used as a setting for bespoke art installations each summer.

There are extensive gardens, formal and naturalistic, such as the linear Quarry Garden. There is wheelchair access to the Quarry Garden, the ground floor of both the Hall and the Castle, and to the café.  The gardens are also Grade I listed on the Historic England Park and Garden Register.

Belsay Hall is administered by English Heritage and is open to the public.

Notes

External links
Official Belsay Hall, Castle and Gardens website - at English Heritage

Grade I listed buildings in Northumberland
Country houses in Northumberland
English Heritage sites in Northumberland
Neoclassical architecture in England
Houses completed in 1817
Historic house museums in Northumberland
Gardens in Northumberland
Greek Revival houses in the United Kingdom
Hall